Thoditthalai Viluthandinar (Tamil: தொடித்தலை விழுத்தண்டினார்) was a poet of the Sangam period, to whom a sole verse of the Sangam literature has been attributed, in addition to verse 22 of the Tiruvalluva Maalai.

Biography
Thoditthalai Viluthandinar was came to be called so owing to the phrase "Thoditthalai Vilutthandu" used in the verse that he composed in Purananuru. This was the only verse that describes the boisterous acts of young men.

Contribution to the Sangam literature
Thoditthalai Viluthandinar has written a sole Sangam verse, namely, verse 243 of the Purananuru, apart from verse 22 of the Tiruvalluva Maalai.

Views on Valluvar and the Kural
Thoditthalai Viluthandinar opines about Valluvar and the Kural text thus:

See also

 Sangam literature
 List of Sangam poets
 Tiruvalluva Maalai

Notes

References

 

Tamil philosophy
Tamil poets
Sangam poets
Tiruvalluva Maalai contributors